Lützerath is a hamlet in the German state of North Rhine-Westphalia, between Aachen and Düsseldorf. In 2013, the Federal Constitutional Court ruled in favour of the expansion of the Garzweiler surface mine; in January 2023, Lützerath was eradicated to make way for the opencast mining of Garzweiler II ; it will eventually be replaced with a lake. A farmer contested the plans which were approved by the higher administrative court in Münster. Climate activists moved to the village, squatting on empty farms and occupying treehouses. In an attempt to save the village, a campaign called "" (Lützerath lives) was started. In October 2022, the federal government and the state of North Rhine-Westphalia announced that RWE would phase out coal mining in the region by 2030, but Lützerath would still be demolished. The eviction occurred in January 2023.

History

The hamlet of Lützerath was first mentioned as Lutzelenrode in 1168. The area had several farms, including the Duissener Hof or Wachtmeisterhof, which was run by the Cistercian monastery in Duisburg from 1265 until 1802. Eckhardt Heukamp became the owner of the last remaining farm.

Mining
In 2013, the Federal Constitutional Court ruled in favour of the expansion of the Garzweiler surface mine in the German state of North Rhine-Westphalia, between Aachen and Düsseldorf. There are thought to be 1.3 billion tons of lignite (also known as brown coal) in the Garzweiler II area. Energy company RWE planned to remove more than 600 million tons of it by opencast mining, which would necessitate the permanent destruction of several villages.

The decision to extend the mining of lignite was controversial and resulted in the displacement of hundreds of people. In 2018, 900 villagers were resettled and several buildings including a church were destroyed. In Erkelenz, multiple wind turbines were demolished. 

By 2021, the hamlet of Lützerath became the centrepoint of the protests against the Garzweiler mine. People had been resettled from the village since 2005; then, Heukamp refused to leave his land. The state government and RWE had planned to demolish Lützerath by the end of 2022, but Heukamp lodged a legal complaint. The court in Aachen found in favour of RWE, so Heukamp went to the higher administrative court in Münster and RWE promised to wait for the decision of the court. After the protests at Hambach Forest, which became known as "Hambi", activists moved to Lützerath, which was nicknamed "Lützi". 

In March 2022, the court ruled that RWE could proceed with the mining and was entitled to demolish the village, so Heukamp left his farm. The Garzweiler mine is eventually planned to be made into a lake.

Occupation

From 2020 onwards, climate activists began to move to Lützerath, first as tenants and then as squatters, as the land was cleared by RWE. By the end of 2022, there were around 80 people living in squatted farms, tents and treehouses. To save the village, a campaign called "" (Lützerath lives) began. A climate activist won  euros on a television show and pledged to spend the money buying up land in the village. 

In April 2022,  people demonstrated against the mine.

In October 2022, the federal government and the state of North Rhine-Westphalia announced that RWE would phase out coal mining in the region by 2030. The protests became larger, with another camp setting up in Keyenberg. Ende Gelände supported the protests. Following the French tactic of Zone to Defend, the occupiers declared Lützerath to be ZAD Rhineland and organised a festival under the slogan "" (All villages remain!) in November 2021.

Eviction
The Heinsberg court issued an order permitting evictions from Lützerath from 10 January 2023 onwards and banned people from going there. Initially, activists confronted the police and drove them back. ZDF estimated there were 2,000 protestors planning to resist the eviction and aiming to prevent the police from accessing the site.

Climate activist Luisa Neubauer and the head of the Earth System Analysis at the Potsdam Institute for Climate Impact Research both condemned the eviction. On 17 January 2023, climate activist Greta Thunberg was arrested by German police while participating in a protest against demolishing the town for a coal mine expansion. The eviction of the village was mostly carried out by 21January 2023.

See also
 
 Church of St. Lambertus, Immerath
 Bund für Umwelt und Naturschutz Deutschland (BUND)
 Ende Gelände 2021, Ende Gelände 2022, Ende Gelände 2023

References

External links
 Lützerath lebt
 Demonstration on 2023-01-14
  [29:27]
  [34:18]

1168 establishments in Europe
Climate change and the environment
Squatting in Germany
Populated places in North Rhine-Westphalia
Mining and the environment